The 2009–10 Nemzeti Bajnokság I was the fifty-eighth series of the national team handball championship for Hungarian women. The defending champions were Győri Audi ETO KC and they managed to defend their title after winning the playoffs with five victories and only one draw. The regular season began on September 5, 2008 and ended on March 28, 2009. The playoff round finished on May 31, with Alba Fehérvár KC beating Hódmezővásárhelyi NKC for the fifth place.

Overview

Teams

The club of Budapest Óbudai Goldberger SE was the only relegated team last season and was replaced by PTE-PEAC from Pécs.

This year's first division championship was geographically pretty well divided : the league gathered two teams from the capital city Budapest (Vasas and FTC), two other from the Northern Great Plain (DVSC and Nyíradony) and Central Transdanubia (Dunaferr and Alcoa), three from the Southern Great Plain (ASA-Consolis-HNKC, Kisunhalas and PTE-PEAC), and finally one from Central Hungary (Vác) and Western Transdanubia (Győr).

After a regular season of 22 matchdays, teams are divided into three groups of four depending on their position. First four teams compete for the title, next four play the 5-8 Classification Round and finally, last four placed clubs play to escape the relegation. In those playoffs, the clubs play in a round-robin system in which points were given according to their position in the regular season.

As Hungarian champions, Győri Audi ETO KC entered the Group Phase of the 2008–09 EHF Women's Champions League. Anita Görbicz's team made a brilliant performance and qualified for the final against Danish Viborg HK but lose by one goal at total score. The runners-up of last season, Dunaferr NK played a qualification tournament but finished second of their group and didn't make it to the next round. Therefore, they were reversed in the EHF Cup. DVSC-Aquaticum entered the third round of the 2008–09 EHF Women's Cup Winners' Cup, won against Italian Pallamano Bancole but was eliminated by Romanian Oțelul Galați. In the EHF Cup, three teams represented Hungary : Dunaferr NK (from the CL), Budapest Bank-FTC-RightPhone and Fehérép Alcoa FKC. First was eliminated in Round 3, the others in the eight-finals. Consequently, only Győri Audi ETO KC played a European Cup's final this season.

Arenas and locations

Regular season

Results

League table

Individual statistics

Top scorers

Team statistics

Overall
 Most wins – Győri Audi ETO KC (20)
 Fewest wins – Vasas SC (1)
 Most losses – Vasas SC (21)
 Fewest losses – Győri Audi ETO KC (2)
 Most goals scored – Budapest Bank-FTC-RightPhone (759)
 Fewest goals scored – Pikker-PTE-PEAC (480)
 Most goals conceded – Vasas SC (739)
 Fewest goals conceded – SONEPAR Békéscsabai ENKSE (503)
 Best goal difference – Győri Audi ETO KC (+234)
 Worst goal difference – Vasas SC (–232)

Home
 Most wins – Győri Audi ETO KC, DVSC-Aquaticum and Budapest Bank-FTC-RightPhone (11)
 Fewest wins – Vasas SC (1)
 Most losses – Vasas SC (10)
 Fewest losses – Győri Audi ETO KC, DVSC-Aquaticum and Budapest Bank-FTC-RightPhone (0)

Away
 Most wins – Győri Audi ETO KC (9)
 Fewest wins – Pikker-PTE-PEAC and Vasas SC (0)
 Most losses – Pikker-PTE-PEAC and Vasas SC (11)
 Fewest losses – Győri Audi ETO KC (2)

Scoring
 Widest winning margin: 27 goals –
 DVSC-Aquaticum 46–19 Kiskunhalas NKSE-Bravotel (23 January 2009)
 Most goals in a match: 82 goals –
 Budapest Bank-FTC-RightPhone 44–38 Tajtavill-Nyíradony (13 September 2008)
 Győri Audi ETO KC 45–37 Budapest Bank-FTC-RightPhone (28 September 2008)
 Fewest goals in a match: 34 goals –
 SONEPAR Békéscsabai ENKSE 18–16 Kiskunhalas NKSE-Bravotel (19 September 2008)
 Most goals scored by losing team: 38 goals –
 Budapest Bank-FTC-RightPhone 44–38 Tajtavill-Nyíradony (13 September 2008)
 Most goals scored in a match by one player: 16 goals –
 Zita Szucsánszki for Budapest Bank-FTC-RightPhone against Tajtavill-Nyíradony (13 September 2008)

Postseason
Teams finished in bottom four positions after the regular season enter the classification round for 9–12 places, where a double round-robin system is used. In addition, they are given bonus points depending on their final position in the regular season: Ninth placed Kiskunhalas got four points, tenth placed Vác received three points, PTE-PEAC got two points and finally, last placed Vasas SC was awarded only one point. Clubs with the two lowest combined points get relegated.

Classification round 9–12

Results

Table

Additional points that were awarded after the final positions in the regular season are indicated in the bonus column.

Classification round 5–8
The system is the same as for the precedent playoffs.

Results

Table

Additional points that were awarded after the final positions in the regular season are indicated in bonus points column.

Classification round 1–4
First four placed teams of the regular season entered the playoffs for the title. After a round-robin system, best placed team was designed champion. This year, Győri Audi ETO KC won the championship with five victories and one draw.

Results

Table

Additional points that were awarded after the final positions in the regular season are indicated in bonus points column.

Final standing

1 Because Magyar Kupa winner Győri Audi ETO KC qualified for the EHF Champions League via their league position, the EHF Cup Winners' Cup spot was passed to cup second, DVSC-Aquaticum.

References

External links
 Handball.hu
 Statistics

2008 in Hungarian sport
2009 in Hungarian sport
Handball leagues in Hungary
Hungary
2008 in women's handball
2009 in women's handball